Togara is a rural locality in the Central Highlands Region, Queensland, Australia.

References 

Central Highlands Region
Localities in Queensland